Make This Your Own is the third and final album by British alternative rock band The Cooper Temple Clause.

It reached #33 in the UK album charts, despite not having the major label backing afforded to the band's first two albums.

Track listing

"Damage" - 3:43
"Homo Sapiens" - 3:26
"Head" - 3:52
"Connect" - 4:09
"Waiting Game" - 3:33
"Once More with Feeling" - 3:16
"What Have You Gone and Done?" - 3:56
"Take Comfort" - 4:21
"All I See Is You" - 6:43
"Isn't It Strange" - 4:34
"House of Cards" - 5:03

External links
 Make This Your Own on record label's site

The Cooper Temple Clause albums
2007 albums
Albums produced by Dan Austin